Yosuke Yamamoto is the name of:
 Yosuke Yamamoto (judoka) (born 1960), Japanese judoka
 Hōmashō Noriyuki (born 1981), Japanese sumo wrestler